Poshtsan-e Gur Abjir (also Romanized as Poshtsān-e Gūr Ābjīr; also known as Poshtsān) is a village in Chapar Khaneh Rural District, Khomam District, Rasht County, Gilan Province, Iran. At the 2006 census, its population was 345, in 100 families.

References 

Populated places in Rasht County